Squalidus wolterstorffi is a species of cyprinid fish endemic to southeastern China.

Named in honor of German geologist, herpetologist and curator Willy Wolterstorff (1864-1943), who “received” fishes from China collected by Martin Kreyenberg, including type specimen of this species.

References

Squalidus
Taxa named by Charles Tate Regan
Fish described in 1908